The High Commissioner of Bangladesh to the Republic of India is the chief diplomatic representative of Bangladesh to India.

List of Bangladeshi High Commissioners to India

See also 
 List of ambassadors of Bangladesh to the United States
 Bangladeshi High Commissioner to Canada
 List of ambassadors of India to Bangladesh
 List of ambassadors of Bangladesh to Kingdom of Saudi Arabia
 List of High Commissioners of Bangladesh to United Kingdom

References

External links
 
  

Bangladesh and the Commonwealth of Nations
India and the Commonwealth of Nations
 
India
Bangladesh
1972 establishments in Bangladesh